General Nikolaos Douvas (born 1947) served as Chief of the Hellenic Army General Staff. General Douvas was honourably discharged from the Hellenic Army on March 1, 2006. After his discharge from the army he has been appointed as president at EKO (the biggest Greek state owned oil company).

Early life and education 
Douvas grew up in Larissa, then attended the Hellenic Military Academy, from which he graduated in 1970, with a commission as a second lieutenant of infantry. Douvas has augmented his early military education serving at several military and civilian colleges and training centers in Greece and the United States, including the Hellenic Advanced School for Warfare, the Hellenic National Defense College, and the Center for Public Jurisprudence and Political Science at the University of Athens School of Law.

External links
Douvas' appointment as CEO at EKO (Greek)

1947 births
Living people
Hellenic Army generals
Grand Crosses of the Order of Honour (Greece)
Grand Crosses of the Order of the Phoenix (Greece)
National and Kapodistrian University of Athens alumni
Chiefs of the Hellenic Army General Staff
People from Larissa (regional unit)